Vicky the Viking is a 2009 German adventure comedy film directed by Michael Herbig, based on Runer Jonsson's Vicke Viking children's book series and its subsequent animated series adaptation Wickie und die starken Männer. Produced by Christian Becker of Rat Pack Filmproduktion it premiered in Munich on 9 September 2009.

On 3 October 2009, during a show of Wetten, dass..?, Herbig was presented with the Goldene Leinwand for the film's viewership of three million within its first 18 weeks. It sold nearly 5 million tickets in Germany alone, for a total gross revenue of nearly $57 million.

Synopsis

Vicky (Jonas Hämmerle) is the son of Halvar (Waldemar Kobus), chief of the Viking village of Flake. Halvar is a strong and big warrior who measures the strength of people through muscles. Vicky, on the other hand, is a small but very smart boy who always has to prove his father that the ingenuity of a man can meet muscles.

One day the village of Flake falls under attack, and all the children – including Vicky's girlfriend Ylvi (Mercedes Jadea Diaz) – are kidnapped except for Vicky himself, so Vicky, his father Halvar and the other Vikings of the village decide to go out and try to rescue them. The kidnappers turn out to be Sven the Terrible and his band of Viking pirates, who are hunting for a legendary treasure, and in order to gain it, they need the assistance of a child who has never spoken a lie in his or her life. Whilst in pursuit, the Flake Vikings pick up a young Chinese girl and an obnoxious bard (Michael Herbig) for company, and together they succeed in rescuing the children, outsmarting Sven and escaping back to Flake with the treasure (though it is not as bountiful as they might have imagined).

Sequel
Due to the film's tremendous success in Germany, a sequel titled Wickie auf großer Fahrt has been made which was released in Germany on September 29, 2011. The sequel film was presented in 3D and included the original cast with the exception of Michael Herbig; it was directed by Christian Ditter.

Cast

References

External links
 
 

2000s German-language films
German adventure comedy films
2000s adventure comedy films
German children's films
Films based on children's books
Films based on Swedish novels
Films directed by Michael Herbig
Films set in the Viking Age
Live-action films based on animated series
Films based on adaptations
2009 comedy films
2009 films
2000s German films